Michel Dorigny (1616 – 20 February 1665) was a French painter and engraver.

Biography
Dorigny was born in Saint-Quentin.  According to the Netherlands Institute for Art History he was a pupil of Georges Lallemand and Simon Vouet. He trained at the Académie de peinture et de sculpture and became the teacher and father to the painters Nicolas and Louis Dorigny. According to Roger de Piles he married Vouet's daughter, and was himself professor of the Academy when he died in Paris.

References

External links 
Michel Dorigny on Artnet

1617 births
1663 deaths
17th-century French painters
French male painters
People from Aisne